Rob McCoy is an American baseball coach, currently serving as the head baseball coach at Niagara University. After attending Clackamas Community College, McCoy attended college at Dakota Wesleyan University, where he played on the school's baseball team. After graduating from Dakota Wesleyan, McCoy served as an assistant baseball coach at Dakota Wesleyan in 2003, James Madison University in 2006, and Niagara University from 2007 to 2008. McCoy was named interim head baseball coach at Niagara University for the 2009 season. Following the conclusion of the 2009 season, McCoy was named the head baseball coach at Niagara on a permanent basis.

Head coaching record

References

External links
Niagara profile

Year of birth missing (living people)
Living people
Dakota Wesleyan Tigers baseball coaches
Dakota Wesleyan Tigers baseball players
James Madison Dukes baseball coaches
Niagara Purple Eagles baseball coaches
University of Virginia alumni
Junior college baseball players in the United States
Clackamas Cougars baseball